The 1898 Yale Bulldogs football team represented Yale University in the 1898 college football season. The Bulldogs finished with a 9–2 record under second-year head coach Frank Butterworth.  The team recorded seven shutouts and won its first nine games by a combined 146 to 11 score.  It then lost its final two games against rivals Princeton (6–0) and Harvard (17–0).

Three Yale players, halfback Malcolm McBride and guards Burr Chamberlain and Gordon Brown, were consensus picks for the 1898 College Football All-America Team.

Schedule

References

Yale
Yale Bulldogs football seasons
Yale Bulldogs football